Shanghai Media & Entertainment Group (SMEG) is one of the largest media conglomerates in China. Founded on April 19, 1997, SMEG is a major media content provider in China that also manages other culture-related businesses such as performances, exhibitions, tourism and hotels.

Organization
The company comprises nine subsidiaries:
Shanghai Media Group (TV and radio stations in Shanghai)
Shanghai Film Group (film, animation, documentary productions in Shanghai)
Shanghai Oriental Pearl (Group) Co., Ltd.
SMEG Performing Arts Center
SMEG Special Events Office
SME Industry Co., Ltd.
SME Technology Development Co., Ltd.
STR International Holdings Co., Ltd.
Shanghai Film Archives

External links
Shanghai Media & Entertainment Group website

Companies based in Shanghai
Mass media companies of China
Chinese-language radio stations
Radio stations in China
Chinese companies established in 1997
Chinese companies established in 2001
Mass media in Shanghai